Zheravna Glacier is a glacier on Greenwich Island, Antarctica situated east of Wulfila Glacier and west of Targovishte Glacier. It is bounded by Razgrad Peak to the west, Ilinden Peak and Momchil Peak to the north, and Viskyar Ridge to the east, extending 2 km in the east–west direction and 1.8 km in the north–south direction, and draining southwards into McFarlane Strait between Ephraim Bluff and Sartorius Point.

The feature is named after the settlement of Zheravna in the eastern Balkan Mountains, Bulgaria.

Location

See also
 List of glaciers in the Antarctic
 Glaciology

Maps
 L.L. Ivanov et al. Antarctica: Livingston Island and Greenwich Island, South Shetland Islands. Scale 1:100000 topographic map. Sofia: Antarctic Place-names Commission of Bulgaria, 2005.
 L.L. Ivanov. Antarctica: Livingston Island and Greenwich, Robert, Snow and Smith Islands. Scale 1:120000 topographic map.  Troyan: Manfred Wörner Foundation, 2009.

References
 Zheravna Glacier. SCAR Composite Antarctic Gazetteer
 Bulgarian Antarctic Gazetteer. Antarctic Place-names Commission. (details in Bulgarian, basic data in English)

External links
 Zheravna Glacier. Copernix satellite image

Glaciers of Greenwich Island